Sleaford Joint Sixth Form is a partnership in Sleaford, England, between Carre's Grammar School and St George's Academy. It has a specialism in Mathematics, Science and Computing.

The Sixth Form was amalgamated in 1983 for students from Sleaford's three secondary schools. At the time it was a partnership between Grammar and comprehensive schools. It was considered to be highly advantageous to all the schools concerned and was featured as a Case Study in a book considering how best to improve schools.

Until 2010 the Joint Sixth Form was inclusive of all Sleaford Secondary Schools: Carre's Grammar School, St George's Academy (formerly St Georges College of Technology) and Kesteven and Sleaford High School. However, before the beginning of the 2010–11 academic year, Kesteven and Sleaford High School left the partnership.

Kesteven and Sleaford High School ceased to take new sixth form students from the Joint Sixth Form from September 2010. Existing students were taught to the end of their courses in June 2011. The other two schools have continued to operate the Joint Sixth Form. The break-up was and remains controversial with the parties disputing responsibility for the decision. A local paper stated that the High School had decided to go its own way, quoting the headteachers from the other two schools, and this is the reason still cited on the Carre's Grammar School website. Conversely, Kesteven and Sleaford High School blamed the fact that St George's had become an academy, which therefore made it impossible for the two schools to operate under a formal and legal agreement together. In February 2015, the Kesteven school expressed its intention to join the Robert Carre Trust along with Carre's which then came into place 1 September 2015. Although the Girl's High School is part of this trust it still operates on its own site, having its own staff, students and facilities.

References

Sixth form colleges in Lincolnshire
Sleaford